Club Deportivo Cabecense is a Spanish football team based in Las Cabezas de San Juan, in the autonomous community of Andalusia. Founded in 1942, it plays in Tercera División – Group 10, holding home matches at Estadio Municipal Carlos Marchena.

Season to season

8 seasons in Tercera División

External links
 
La Preferente team profile 
Soccerway team profile

Football clubs in Andalusia
Association football clubs established in 1942
1942 establishments in Spain